Dempseytown is an unincorporated community located in the Oakland Township, Venango County, Pennsylvania at the intersection of Pennsylvania Route 428 and 417. The town was named after its first settlers, the Dempsey family, who built their home in the 1800s. There are no stop lights in Dempseytown. Two Mile Run is a local attraction with camping and fishing.

Unincorporated communities in Venango County, Pennsylvania
Unincorporated communities in Pennsylvania